This article contains a list of jargon used to varying degrees by railway enthusiasts, trainspotters, and railway employees in Australia, including nicknames for various locomotives and multiple units. Although not exhaustive, many of the entries in this list appear from time to time in specialist, rail-related publications. There may be significant regional variation in usage; state variances may be indicated by the state abbreviation (e.g. VIC, NSW).

B
 Bandicoot (QLD)
 An EMU with a distinctive grey band painted across the cab wind shields
 BETY
 QR pacific type BB18¼ 4-6-2 steam locomotive used on express passenger and freight trains—named after the telegraphic code
 Blue babies
 QR DD17 class suburban tank engine, in a blue midway between navy and sky blue
 Broad gauge
  as used in the states of Victoria and South Australia. Standard gauge of  exists nationwide except for the state of Tasmania, Queensland runs some narrower  lines as do the states of Western Australia and South Australia. The island state of Tasmania is exclusively .
 Brown bomber
 A QR C17 4-8-0 (2D) steam engine, typically painted brown
Blue Goose
Nickname for a livery used by the PTC in NSW. Found on B, S, V and W sets as well as Tulloch trailers
Blood and Bone
Nickname for a livery used by V/Line

C
 Centralized traffic control (CTC)
 A system in which signals and switches for a given area of track are controlled from a centralized location
 Conductor
 The person checking tickets on a tram or train
 Creamy Kate
 Colloquial name for NSW Rail Motor No.38
 Cyclops
 An EMU with one cab modified to only have one central wind shield, which can then only be used as a guard's cab in the middle of a six-car set
Candy
Nickname for livery used by the State Rail Authority in NSW
Cheeseburger
Nickname for the V/Line Mk 3 Livery (2008-2017), which features the colours red, white and yellow.

D
 DERM
 Victorian diesel electric rail motor
 Detonator (DET) (Railway Track Signal)
 An explosive device placed on rail and triggered by wheel pressure—used to warn of hazard ahead
 Dog or dogspike
 A spike with a slightly altered head shape for easier extraction when the spike has become too loose in the sleeper
 Doggies (VIC)
 Former "dog box" type red suburban trains
 Dolly
 A shunting signal

E
 Electric staff
 System of safeworking used on single track to allow the movement of trains
 Electric multiple unit (EMU) (QLD)
 A specific class of suburban train
 Evans set (QLD)
 Brisbane wooden suburban set

F 
Foamer

Slang for a rather obsessive rail or tramway enthusiast

G
 Gabby
 A rail enthusiast or train spotter who photographs Hitachi suburban electric trains in particular
 Guard
 The person in charge of the train
 Gunzel
 A rail or tramway enthusiast

H
 Harris (VIC)
 Former Harris type (or Blue) electric suburban train.

 High Flyer 
 nickname given to the NSWGR Z15 & Z16 class locomotives

K
Katie
NSWGR D55 class locomotive – most likely derived from original class numbering KT

L
 Lamp
 A portable (often handheld) light source that is used to signal train crews
 Light-headed guard
 See Battery-operated guard.

N
 Nanny
 NSW C.35 Class locomotive – probably derived from original class numbers NN
 Number nicker or number shark
 A rail fan who writes down numbers of trains they have seen

O
 OSCAR (Outer Suburban Carriage)
 NSW TrainLink H set, a class of electric train operated in New South Wales

P
 PawPaw
 QR class 1170 diesel
 Peg
 Colloquial term for train staff (token)
 Petrol electric rail motor (PERM)
 A railmotor operated by the Victorian Railways of Australia, later called the Diesel Electric Rail Motor
 Pig
 Colloquial name for NSW C.36 Class locomotive
 Plastic Fantastic
 Colloquial name for NSW XPT (Express Passenger Train)

R
 Rail motor stopping place (RMSP)
 A short platform on a country line specifically for picking up and setting down of passengers of a rail motor
 Rattler (Qld)
 Colloquial term for former Evans sets in Brisbane
 Red Rattler (NSW)
 A colloquial term for the first-generation single-deck suburban trains from Sydney which operated from 1926 to 1993
 Red Rattler (Vic.)
 A slang term for a Tait train, a vintage suburban train from Melbourne

S
 Silver (Vic)
 Colloquial term for the Hitachi suburban trains.
 Six-volt guard
 See Battery-operated guard.
 Snapper (Qld)
 Roaming staff who check tickets on trains or at stations
 Spark
 A suburban electric train
 Standard gauge (Qld)
 , as opposed to the 1435mm standard gauge used in other states
 Steel set
 QR suburban passenger sets from 1960s, replacing the Evans sets
 Stick
 Colloquial term for signal
 Sweat Set
 Colloquial term for Sydney Trains S sets
 Ridgy
 Colloquial term for the Sydney trains S, C and K sets.
Silver Stripes/Silver ribbons
Nickname for a livery V/Line used in their formation years, original livery was from VicRail

T
 Tangara
 Also Known As Sydney Trains T set, a class of electric suburban train in Sydney
 Tin Hare
 The NSW 42-foot or CPH class rail motor
 Twix
 Two trains on the same mainline
Teacup
Nickname for a livery used by VicRail, also known as Silver ribbons (and other names)

U 
 Uniform gauge (QLD)
 Standard gauge

W 
 White set
 A Queensland Railways long-distance train sporting their livery from the 1950s
 Waratah
 Sydney Trains A and B sets, also known as Waratahs, are electric passenger trains in Sydney

X 
Xtrap (VIC)

Short for X'Trapolis 100, electric passenger trains in Melbourne.

See also 

 Glossary of rail transport terms
 Glossary of New Zealand railway terms
 Glossary of North American railway terms
 Glossary of United Kingdom railway terms
 Passenger rail terminology

References 

Australia
Rail transport in Australia
Wikipedia glossaries using description lists